Giuseppe Caletti or Calletti (c. 1600 - c. 1660) was an Italian painter and engraver of the Baroque period, active in Ferrara and Cremona. He often painted religious themes in a genre like dress and surroundings, including the theme of Bacchanalia like Titian.

Biography
Born in Cremona, also called il Cremonese. He is described by Laderchi as masterless, and of irregular life, always in trouble... disquieted, and untameable. Like Dossi, the figures are generally smaller than life, and often placed in fantastic locales such as ‘’wild boars in the sea, and dolphins in the forests". He painted the Four Doctors of the Church, and the Miracle of St. Mark, both for the church of San Benedetto at Ferrara. He engraved twenty-four plates characterized by a peculiar manner of treatment, consisting of the employment of bold parallel strokes without any cross-hatching. Among the more important of them are: David, whole-length, with the head of Goliath; David half-length, with the same.; Samson and Delilah; The Beheading of St John; St Roch kneeling; and Portraits of the Dukes of Ferrara.

His models have been variously listed as Guercino, Titian, and Dosso Dossi. He apparently befriended Antonio Randa, a Bolognese painter, but became involved in brawls and had to flee Bologna. Some of his works are found in churches of Ferrara, including the church of St. John the Baptist, where he collaborated with Francesco Naselli. Caletti died in Ferrara.

Gallery

References
Biography in Italian.

External links
 Census of Ferrarese Paintings and Drawings

1600s births
1660s deaths
Artists from Cremona
17th-century Italian painters
Italian male painters
Painters from Ferrara
Italian Baroque painters